Haim Sompolinsky (born 1949, in Copenhagen, Denmark), is the William N. Skirball Professor of Neuroscience at the Edmond and Lily Safra Center for Brain Sciences (formerly the Interdisciplinary Center for Neural Computation), and a professor of physics at the Racah Institute of Physics at The Hebrew University of Jerusalem, Israel. He is also a visiting professor in the Center of Brain Science at Harvard University and the director of Harvard's Swartz Program in Theoretical Neuroscience. He is widely regarded as one of the leaders of theoretical neuroscience.

Biography 
Haim Sompolinsky received his Ph.D. in physics from Bar-Ilan University in Israel in 1980. He then worked as postdoctoral fellow in the physics department at Harvard University until 1982, under the supervision of Professor Bertrand Halperin. He was appointed associate professor of physics at Bar-Ilan University until 1986, when he moved to the Hebrew University of Jerusalem as professor of physics. Sompolinsky's research in theoretical physics covered the fields of phase transitions, critical phenomena, nonlinear dynamics and the statistical mechanics of spin glasses. Since the mid-1980s, he has pioneered the new field of computational neuroscience, introducing methods and concepts of theoretical physics to the study of neuronal circuits, memory, learning and neuronal information processing.

In 1992, he helped found Hebrew University's Interdisciplinary Center for Neural Computation and served as its director from 2008 to 2010. He is currently the William N. Skirball Professor of Neuroscience and serves on the executive board of the newly established Edmond and Lily Safra Center for Brain Sciences at the Hebrew University. He was a visiting scholar at several institutions, including Bell Laboratories and New York University, and serves on the faculty of the Methods in Computational Neuroscience Course at the Marine Biology Lab.

Sompolinsky's research includes spike-based neural learning and computation, neuronal population codes, sensory representations, dynamics and function of sensory and motor cortical circuits, and large-scale structure and dynamics of human brain. He also studies the relation between physics, neuroscience, and human volition, freedom and agency.

From 2006, Sompolinsky has served as a visiting professor in the Center of Brain Science at Harvard University and the director of Harvard's Swartz Program in Theoretical Neuroscience.

In 2022, Sompolinsky has been elected fellow of the Israel Physical Society.

Honors 
 Foreign Honorary Member of the American Academy of Arts and Sciences, 2008 
 Landau Prize for Brain Science, 2008 
 Swartz Prize for Theoretical and Computational Neuroscience of the US Society for Neuroscience, 2011
 Mathematical Neuroscience Prize from Israel Brain Technologies, 2013
 The EMET Prize for Art, Science and Culture (Brain Science), 2016
 Gruber Neuroscience Prize, 2022

References

External links
CV on Hebrew University of Jerusalem 
Swartz Program for Theoretical Neuroscience at Harvard
Neurophysics lab
Profile on Simons Foundation

1949 births
Living people
Israeli neuroscientists
Bar-Ilan University alumni
EMET Prize recipients in the Life Sciences